Kill Them with Kindness is the debut full-length album by indie rock band Headlights.  It was released by the Polyvinyl Record Co. in 2006.

Track listing
All songs written by Erin Fein / Tristan Wraight.
 "Your Old Street" - 6:06
 "TV" - 2:37
 "Put Us Back Together Right" - 4:14
 "Pity City" - 3:48
 "Songy Darko" - 3:41
 "Owl Eyes" - 2:50
 "The Midwest Is the Best" - 0:18
 "Lions" - 1:48
 "Lullabies" - 3:44
 "Struggle with Numbers" - 1:27
 "Words Make You Tired" - 3:47
 "Hi-Ya!" - 2:21
 "Signs Point to Yes (But Outlook Not So Good)" - 3:40
 "I Love, You Laugh" - 2:23

References

2006 albums
Polyvinyl Record Co. albums